Be Water, My Friend is an upcoming Hong Kong domestic drama film directed by Anthony Pun and starring Chow Yun-fat as a pathological gambler who searches a way to communicate and connect with his autistic son. The film's English title is based on Bruce Lee's famous quote on martial arts philosophy. Production for the film began in January 2019 and wrapped up in late March of the same year.

Plot
Fai, a compulsive gambler and an irresponsible man, is asked to take care of his ex-girlfriend Chik's (Anita Yuen) son, Yeung. Chik also reveals to Fai that Yeung is his son, and promises to pay him HK$100,000, so Fai agrees to be a father for one month.

Soon, Fai notices his son has autism and gets to understand the difficulties of raising a child with special needs. When Chik fails to show up on the date when they agreed to meet, Fai realises why she brought him his child.

He finds his life goal while discovering Yeung's talent on the racing field, then decides to give up his former dissipated life and to accompany his son as he sets out to achieve his dream.

Cast
Chow Yun-fat as Fai (阿輝)
Anita Yuen as Lee Chik (李夕)
Alex Fong
Liu Kai-chi
Michael Ning
Kenny Wong

Production
With a budget of US$40 million, Be Water, My Friend was shot on location in Hong Kong, Macau and China.

On 7 March 2019, Chow suffered from an injury on set while filming a scene where he was threatened by co-star Kenny Wong who played a debt collector with a hairspray bottle on hand. In the scene, Wong was preparing to toss the hairspray bottle from his left hand to his right, but the cover of the bottle popped off and struck Chow on his forehead. Despite his forehead bleeding, Chow continued filming the scene. Originally wanting to continue the shoot for the rest of the day, director Anthony Pun and action director Nicky Li eventually advised him to seek treatment at the hospital where he received five stitches.

See also
Chow Yun-fat filmography

References

Upcoming films
Hong Kong drama films
Cantonese-language films
Films set in Hong Kong
Films set in Macau
Films set in China
Films shot in Hong Kong
Films shot in Macau
Films shot in China